Kelly Ridge is a census-designated place in Butte County, northern California.

Geography
Kelly Ridge sits at an elevation of 1050 feet (320 m), on a ridge above Lake Oroville reservoir in the Sierra Nevada foothills. The community of Kelly Ridge offers direct access to boating, camping, fishing and a variety of water sports. This neighborhood is closely connected to the city of Oroville and is a popular place to retire and enjoy the outdoors.

The 2010 United States census reported Kelly Ridge's population was 2,544.

Demographics

At the 2010 census Kelly Ridge had a population of 2,544. The racial makeup of Kelly Ridge was 2,287 (89.9%) White, 20 (0.8%) African American, 56 (2.2%) Native American, 35 (1.4%) Asian, 7 (0.3%) Pacific Islander, 43 (1.7%) from other races, and 96 (3.8%) from two or more races. Hispanic or Latino of any race were 204 people (8.0%).

The whole population lived in households, no one lived in non-institutionalized group quarters and no one was institutionalized.

There were 1,224 households, 195 (15.9%) had children under the age of 18 living in them, 599 (48.9%) were opposite-sex married couples living together, 102 (8.3%) had a female householder with no husband present, 38 (3.1%) had a male householder with no wife present.  There were 65 (5.3%) unmarried opposite-sex partnerships, and 13 (1.1%) same-sex married couples or partnerships. 391 households (31.9%) were one person and 244 (19.9%) had someone living alone who was 65 or older. The average household size was 2.08.  There were 739 families (60.4% of households); the average family size was 2.57.

The age distribution was 337 people (13.2%) under the age of 18, 152 people (6.0%) aged 18 to 24, 383 people (15.1%) aged 25 to 44, 730 people (28.7%) aged 45 to 64, and 942 people (37.0%) who were 65 or older.  The median age was 57.4 years. For every 100 females, there were 91.6 males.  For every 100 females age 18 and over, there were 89.8 males.

There were 1,430 housing units at an average density of ,of which 1,224 were occupied, 993 (81.1%) by the owners and 231 (18.9%) by renters.  The homeowner vacancy rate was 3.9%; the rental vacancy rate was 7.9%.  1,947 people (76.5% of the population) lived in owner-occupied housing units and 597 people (23.5%) lived in rental housing units.

References

Census-designated places in Butte County, California
Populated places in the Sierra Nevada (United States)
Census-designated places in California